Tortolena is a genus of North American and Central American funnel weavers first described by R. V. Chamberlin & Wilton Ivie in 1941.  it contains only two species.

References

External links

Agelenidae
Araneomorphae genera
Spiders of North America